Noel M. Tichy is an American management consultant, author and educator. He has co-authored, edited or contributed to over 30 books. While teaching at the MBA program at the University of Michigan (Ross School of Business), Tichy along with Jim Danko and Paul Danos, first instituted " the defining attribute" of the program: Multidisciplinary Action Projects in which students work on an actual corporate business issue. In 2009, the Washington Post named Control Your Destiny or Someone Else Will which he co-authored with  Stratford Sherman  as one of the Top 10 leadership books. As the director of global development at GE's Crotonville, from 1985–1987 he instituted the action learning programs which helped make it "one of the premiere corporate learning centers in the world."

He has been named one of the top "Management Gurus". He is an advocate of leaders being teachers as well as managers. He is the co-author along with Warren Bennis of Judgment: How Winning Leaders Make Great Calls. The New York Times review stated that they "write about 'empowering frontline people,' but they seem hung up on finding that single Great Leader. " His book Succession says that most organization's leadership succession plans are merely check-the-box activities which are not appropriately executed and outlines seven common failures. The New York Times says that his book is "sometimes angry" and uses case studies to make his points. Tichy has been an adviser for over 30 CEO transitions, including General Motors.

Tichy is a professor at the University of Michigan Business School. He has an undergraduate degree from Colgate University (1986) and graduates and Ph.D. from Columbia University. He taught at Yale in 1972 and was a professor at Columbia University from 1972-1980 before becoming a professor at the University of Michigan in 1981.

Select bibliography 
 Organization design for primary health care: The case of the Dr. Martin Luther King Jr. Health Center (Praeger special studies in U.S. economic, social, and political issues) (1977), Praeger
 Managing Strategic Change: Technical, Political, and Cultural Dynamics (1983), John Wiley & Sons, 
 Strategic Human Resource Management – with Charles Fombrun and Anne Devanna (1984), Wiley, 
 The Transformational Leader – with Mary Anne Devanna, (1990) Wiley, 
 Control Your Destiny or Someone Else Will – with  Stratford Sherman (1993), HarperCollins, 
 Globalizing Management: Creating and Leading the Competitive Organization – with Vladimir Pucik and Carole K. Barnett (1993), Wiley, 
 Control Destiny: Reengineer a Corporation (1994), HarperCollins Publishers, 
 The Leadership Engine – with Eli Cohen (1997)
 Corporate Global Citizenship: Doing Business in the Public Eye – with Andrew R. McGill and Lynda St. Clair (1997), Lexington Books, 
 The Ethical Challenge: How to Lead with Unyielding Integrity – with Andrew McGill (2003), John Wiley & Sons, 
 Judgment: How Winning Leaders Make Great Calls – with Warren Bennis (2007), Penguin Publishing Group, 
 The Cycle of Leadership HarperBusiness; 1st edition (August 2002), HarperBusiness, 
 Judgment on the Front Line: How Smart Companies Win by Trusting Their People, with Chris DeRose. New York: Penguin Group, 2012.
 Succession: Mastering the Make-or-Break Process of Leadership Transition (2014), Penguin,

References 

American management consultants
Living people
Ross School of Business faculty
Columbia University alumni
Year of birth missing (living people)